Valentino Macchi (4 August 1937 - 19 March 2013) was an Italian actor. He appeared in more than one hundred films from 1962 to 2008. His last appearance was in 2008 and died on March 19, 2013, at his home in Rome

Selected filmography

1962: Boccaccio '70 - Friend of Man Winning a Bottle (segment "La riffa") (uncredited)
1962: Sodoma e Gomorra - (uncredited)
1963: Uno strano tipo - Young Man at Fiesta (uncredited)
1964: Samson and His Mighty Challenge
1965: Man Called Gringo - Tim Walton
1965: Soldati e caporali - Caporale
1965: Salome '73
1965: Te lo leggo negli occhi
1966: Tecnica di un omicidio - Photographic Lab Assistant (uncredited)
1966: Web of Violence
1966: Yankee - Garcia
1966: Star Black
1966: Arizona Colt
1966: Zorro il ribelle - Ramon
1966: Seven Vengeful Women
1966: Che notte, ragazzi!
1966: Black Box Affair - Il mondo trema
1966: Sugar Colt
1966: Shoot Loud, Louder... I Don't Understand
1966: Django Shoots First
1966: Perry Grant, agente di ferro
1966: Last Man to Kill - Sergente di Polizia
1966: Il Natale che quasi non fu
1966: Navajo Joe - Gringo Scalphunter
1966: Superargo Versus Diabolicus
1966: È mezzanotte... butta giù il cadavere - Gianni
1966: I due sanculotti
1967: 7 Bullets for Gringo - Train Engineer
1967: Danger!! Death Ray - Henchman 'X3'
1967: The Three Fantastic Supermen - Golem's Engineer
1967: The 25th Hour
1967: The Witches - Man at Stadium (segment "Sera come le altre, Una")
1967: We Still Kill the Old Way
1967: The Taming of the Shrew - Complementary role
1967: Ballata da un miliardo
1967: Dick Smart 2.007
1967: Kommissar X - Drei grüne Hunde - (uncredited)
1967: Assicurasi vergine - Worker at oil wells
1967: Flashman
1967: La ragazza del bersagliere (1967) - Interpreter
1967: Killer Caliber .32 - Young Man in Coach
1967: 20.000 dollari sul 7
1967: Devilman Story - Escapee
1967: Poker with Pistols
1967: Golden Chameleon
1967: Assault on the State Treasure - Record Oil Company board member
1967: The Last Killer
1967: Tiffany Memorandum (1967) - Cunningham's Agent Disguised as a Nurse
1967: Gentleman Jo... uccidi
1967: Quando dico che ti amo - The Recording Engineer
1967: Assassination
1967: The Stranger
1967: Virgin of the Jungle - Missionar
1967: Any Gun Can Play - Charro Ruiz
1967: Grand Slam
1967: Killer Kid
1967: How to Kill 400 Duponts
1967: Non Pensare a Me
1967: Death on the Run
1967: Bandidos
1967: More Than a Miracle
1967: An Italian in America
1967: Halleluja for Django
1967: The Girl and the General - Soldier (uncredited)
1967: Arabella
1967: Ghosts – Italian Style
1967: Two Faces of the Dollar - Lt. Laffan
1967: Soldati e capelloni - Un commilitone
1967: Non mi dire mai goodbye
1967: Your Turn to Die
1967: L'immensità (La ragazza del Paip's)
1967: Il ragazzo che sapeva amare
1967: I due vigili - Giuseppe, il maggiordomo
1967: Dirty Heroes
1968: Se vuoi vivere... spara!
1968: Superargo and the Faceless Giants - Bank Guard
1968: Acid - Delirio dei sensi
1968: The Young, the Evil and the Savage - Policeman
1968: Gunman Sent by God - Circus spectator
1968: The Sweet Body of Deborah - Garagista
1968: La notte è fatta per... rubare
1968: L'oro del mondo - Student
1968: King of Africa - (uncredited)
1968: Psychopath - Train conductor
1968: Come l'amore
1968: Il figlio di Aquila Nera - (uncredited)
1968: Faustina - Carabiniere
1968: Il diario segreto di una minorenne (è nata una donna)
1969: Il ragazzo che sorride - Party guest
1969: Gli infermieri della mutua - Un medico
1970: Balsamus, l'uomo di Satana - Man without an arm
1971: Sacco & Vanzetti - Uomo in sala di processo (uncredited)
1971: Il clan dei due Borsalini - Ladro
1972: Execution Squad - Policeman (uncredited)
1972: When Women Were Called Virgins - Servant of Varrone
1972: Il terrore con gli occhi storti - speaker TV
1972: Continuavano a chiamarli... er più e er meno - Prison Guard (uncredited)
1973: Non ho tempo1973: The Bloody Hands of the Law1974: Flavia the Heretic - Impaled Friar
1974: Il saprofita1974: Conversation Piece1975: La mazurka del barone, della santa e del fico fiorone - Petazzoni (voice, uncredited)
1975: Calling All Police Cars - Petrol Station Attendant
1975: Vergine, e di nome Maria1975: Eye of the Cat - Collaborator with Cesare (uncredited)
1975: Il caso Raoul1976: House of Pleasure for Women - Agente
1976: Rome Armed to the Teeth - Franco
1976: Free Hand for a Tough Cop - Policeman
1976: Goodnight, Ladies and Gentlemen - Interviewer of the Judge (uncredited)
1977: Tutti defunti... tranne i morti - Prete
1977: Stato interessante - Annabella's Wooer (second story)
1978: La banda del gobbo - Brigadiere
1993: Diary of a Maniac1994: Oasi - Father-in-law
1998: Incontri proibiti - Portiere dell'albergo a Bologna
2003: Incantato2004: Christmas Rematch - Controllore
2007: Codice silenzioso''

References

External links 

1937 births
2013 deaths
Italian male film actors